Fire King may refer to:
Fire King (video game), 1989
Fire King, one of the GWR 3031 Class locomotives that ran on the Great Western Railway between 1891 and 1915
Fire King, alternative name of The King of Blaze (manhua), 1990s Taiwanese comic book
Fire-King, American glassware brand